Gaurena is a genus of moths belonging to the subfamily Thyatirinae of the Drepanidae. It was erected by Francis Walker in 1865.

Species
 Gaurena albifasciata Gaede, 1931
 Gaurena argentisparsa Hampson, 1896
 Gaurena aurofasciata Hampson, 1892
 Gaurena delattini Werny, 1966
 Gaurena florens Walker, 1865
 Gaurena florescens Walker, 1865
 Gaurena forsteri Werny, 1966
 Gaurena gemella Leech, 1900
 Gaurena grisescens Oberthür, 1894
 Gaurena margaritha Werny, 1966
 Gaurena nigrescens Werny, 1966
 Gaurena olivacea Houlbert, 1921
 Gaurena pretiosa Werny, 1966
 Gaurena roesleri Werny, 1966
 Gaurena sinuata Warren, 1912
 Gaurena watsoni Werny, 1966

Former species
 Gaurena dierli Werny, 1966
 Gaurena fletcheri Werny, 1966

References

  (1865). List of Specimens of Lepidopterous Insects in the Collection of the British Museum 32: 619.
  (2007). "The Thyatiridae of Eurasia including the Sundaland and New Guinea (Lepidoptera)". Esperiana Buchreihe zur Entomologie. Band 13: 1–683.

Thyatirinae
Drepanidae genera